Pavel Viktorovich Malkov (born 29 January 1980) is a Russian politician who is currently serving as the 7th Governor of Ryazan Oblast since 21 September 2022.

Biography 

Pavel Malkov was born in Saratov on 29 January 1980. 

In 2001, he graduated from Saratov State Technical University with a degree in Computer Science and Automated Systems Software.

Between 2003 and 2006, he worked in various positions in the Government of Saratov Oblast.

In 2004, he underwent professional retraining at the  named after P. A. Stolypin with a degree in State and Municipal Administration.

From 2006 to 2009, he was the Deputy Minister of Economic Development and Trade of Saratov Oblast.

From 2008 to 2009, he studied at the Academy of National Economy under the Government of the Russia under the MBA program, specializing in Information Management.

From 2009 to 2010, he was the Deputy Director of the industrial enterprise EPO "Signal".

From 2010 to 2012, he was the Head of the Committee on Informatization of Saratov Oblast, while serving as Minister of the Government of Saratov Oblast.

In 2012, he served as Deputy Chairman of the Government of Saratov Oblast.

From 2012 to 2017, he was the Deputy Director of the Department of State Regulation in the Economy of the Ministry of Economic Development of Russia. From 2017 to 2018, he was promoted to the Director of the Department.

From 2018 to 2022, Malkov was the Head of the  Federal State Statistics Service (Rosstat).

Acting Governor of Ryazan Oblast 

On 10 May 2022, Malkov was appointed the acting Governor of Ryazan Oblast by the President of Russia. Elections are scheduled for 11 September 2022.

References 

1980 births
Living people
1st class Active State Councillors of the Russian Federation
Politicians from Saratov
Russian statisticians
Governors of Ryazan Oblast